János Kintzig was a Hungarian politician, who served as Minister of Agriculture in the Counter-revolutionary Government of Arad and Szeged during the Hungarian Soviet Republic.

References
 Magyar Életrajzi Lexikon

Agriculture ministers of Hungary
Year of birth missing
Year of death missing